Charles "Charlie" Q. Kamps (born March 21, 1932, in Milwaukee, Wisconsin) is an American sailor and lawyer. As sailor he competed in many Soling World, European and North American Championships since the creation of the Soling class (1969).

Sailing career

Kamps is since the early day's of the Soling strongly involved with the class. He served for many years in the executive committee of the International Soling Association. As sailor he took many times the podium. Charlie competed over 20 times in the Soling North American Championship.

The 1979 edition of the Soling North American Championship had a long aftermath. In race 5, Kamps (US 697) was penalized with a 50% bonus as result of a protest from Mac Dunwoody (US 574), Houston. Kamps made several appeals what resulted in a reinstatement of Kamps and a penalty of 50% bonus for Mac Dunwoody on 5 February 1981. This decision was made by the TYA Appeals Committee.

Personal life
Kamps and his wife, Mary, have two children. Kamps is a retired partner with Quarles & Brady LLP.

Publications
Kamps is author/co-author of:
 "Dealing With the Agencies," Quarles & Brady Clean Air Act program, 1990 
 "DNR Compliance and Other Environmental Considerations," Quarles & Brady program, 1988

References

1932 births
American male sailors (sport)
Lawyers from Milwaukee
Living people
Marquette University alumni
Soling class sailors
Sportspeople from Milwaukee